Rocco Castoro (born 1982) is an American editor and writer. He graduated from the University of Florida with a Bachelor of Science (BS) in Journalism.After serving as an Associate Editor at Satellite Magazine, he joined VICE Magazine in 2006 as an editorial intern and was appointed editor-in-chief in March 2011, and left Vice in 2015. In October 2018, Castoro joined Collider as Creative Director of Collider Studios.

SCNR
In 2020, Castoro became editor in chief of SCNR, an online channel partly funded by commentator Tim Pool. SCNR later collapsed following the 2021 United States Capitol attack.

References

External links 
Articles by Castoro at VICE.com
SCNR official site

American editors
Living people
1982 births
University of Florida alumni
Vice Media
American male journalists